Enfield Falls Mill and Miller's House, also known as Treman House and Mill, is a historic grist mill and former millowner's residence located at Robert H. Treman State Park near Ithaca in Tompkins County, New York. The mill is a -story frame structure over a stone foundation. It is a turbine-powered mill constructed in 1839.  The mill has three runs of stones: one for griding buckwheat, one for grinding wheat, and a third for grinding coarser grain.  The mill ceased operation in 1917.  The millowner's house is a simple but elegant vernacular Greek Revival–style dwelling.  The house consists of a -story main section, with a slightly lower L-shaped wing.  It serves as home for the park superintendent.

It was listed on the National Register of Historic Places in 1979.

References

Grinding mills on the National Register of Historic Places in New York (state)
Houses completed in 1839
Houses on the National Register of Historic Places in New York (state)
Houses in Tompkins County, New York
Grinding mills in New York (state)
Buildings and structures in Ithaca, New York
National Register of Historic Places in Tompkins County, New York